The palmar tree frog (Boana pellucens) is a species of frog in the family Hylidae found in Colombia and Ecuador. Its natural habitats are subtropical or tropical moist lowland forests, swamps, freshwater marshes, rural gardens, urban areas, heavily degraded former forests, and ponds.

References

pellucens
Amphibians of Colombia
Amphibians of Ecuador
Amphibians described in 1901
Taxonomy articles created by Polbot